Manteca is an album by jazz pianist Red Garland, released in 1958 on Prestige Records. The CD reissue included a bonus track recorded during the same session.

Track listing 
"Manteca" (Dizzy Gillespie, Chano Pozo, Gil Fuller) – 8:07
"S'Wonderful" (Gershwin, Gershwin) – 6:42
"Lady Be Good" (Gershwin, Gershwin) – 5:50
"Exactly Like You" (Dorothy Fields, Jimmy McHugh) – 7:08
"Mort's Report" (Garland) – 12:11
"Portrait of Jenny" (Gordon Burdge, J. Russel Robinson) – 7:18 Bonus track on CD reissue

Personnel 
 Red Garland - piano
 Paul Chambers - double bass
 Art Taylor - drums
 Ray Barretto - congas

References 

1959 albums
Albums produced by Bob Weinstock
Prestige Records albums
Red Garland albums
Albums recorded at Van Gelder Studio